Basirabad may refer to:
 Basirabad, East Azerbaijan
 Basirabad, Golestan